Allocasuarina  grampiana, commonly known as Grampians sheoak, is  a dioecious shrub or tree of the family Casuarinaceae. The species is endemic to the Grampians in Victoria, Australia where it grows on sandstone outcrops. It grows to between 1 and 4 metres high and has ascending needle-like branchlets to 15 cm long  which have a waxy bloom. Cones are cylindrical and are between 13 and 35 mm long and about 8mm in diameter. These produce 5mm long winged seeds.

The species was formally described in 1989 by botanist Lawrie Johnson, based on plant material collected at Mount Rosea.

References

grampiana
Flora of Victoria (Australia)
Fagales of Australia
Plants described in 1989
Dioecious plants